"Piss Up a Rope" is a song by the American rock band Ween, released in 1996 on their album 12 Golden Country Greats. It was released on 7" yellow vinyl single on Diesel Only Records.

History
When asked about the lyrics "You can wash my balls with a warm wet rag" and "On your knees, you big bootied bitch," Dean Ween stated that he wrote the song for his wife. The inspiration for the title came from his father: "[It is] a funny expression that I copped from my dad. When I was a kid, he used to say, 'Aw, go piss up a rope.' It was just nonsense. It was like, 'Aw, go shit in your hat' or whatever."

Reception
AllMusic critic Stephen Thomas Erlewine considered the song to be a "truly delightful gem", and one of the best songs from the album.

In popular culture
 The song is heard in the background in a scene in the cafe from a May 2008 episode of English soap opera EastEnders.
 The song can be heard in the movie U Turn when Bobby (Sean Penn) asks Darrell (Billy Bob Thornton) to replace a radiator hose.

References

1996 singles
Ween songs
1996 songs
Songs written by Gene Ween
Songs written by Dean Ween